Regarding the Pain of Others is a 2003 book-length essay by Susan Sontag, which was nominated for the National Book Critics Circle Award. It was her last published book before her death in 2004. It is regarded by many to be a follow-up or addendum to On Photography, despite the fact that the two essay collections convey Sontag's radically different opinions about photography. The essay is especially interested in war photography. Using photography as evidence for her opinions, Sontag sets out to answer one of the three questions posed in Virginia Woolf's book Three Guineas, "How in your opinion are we to prevent war?"

While debunking a certain number of common misconceptions (including some to which she contributed) concerning images of pain, horror, and atrocity, Regarding the Pain of Others both underscores their importance and undercuts hopes that they can communicate very much. On the one hand, narrative and framing confer upon images most of their meaning, and on the other, Sontag says, those who have not lived through such things "can't understand, can't imagine" the experiences such images represent.

References

2003 non-fiction books
Works by Susan Sontag
Books about war photography
Farrar, Straus and Giroux books